Today's Active Lifestyles is Polvo's second studio album. It was produced by Bob Weston and released on Merge Records in 1993.

Cover

Early versions of the cover art featured red tigers in the yellow colour field, but these were soon removed due to a lawsuit from its painter Andy Freeburn.

Release

The album was released on Merge Records. "Tilebreaker" was released as a 7" single with the song "Chameleon" and the instrumental "Tiara Fetish" on the B-side. ("Tiara Fetish" would later appear, with lyrics, as the song "Watch the Nail" on the Merge compilation 5 Rows of Teeth.)

Reception

The album went on to receive mostly positive reviews upon release. Tracy Fey of Allmusic called it "an excellent album with many layers." "Never a band to follow formulaic musical styles," she writes, "Polvo once again shakes things up with its twisted song structures of multiple tempos and intricate, distorted guitars." Gerry McGovern of Hot Press gave the album a very positive review, calling it "a massive album. In the sense that it is sprawling, falling, tipping all over the place." He writes that the album sounds the way "Sonic Youth might if Sonic Youth untuned their untuned guitars." CD Review wrote that the album "has all the credentials for a bona fide indie rock classic." Spin wrote that the "refreshingly potent" album sounds more like a "top-notch Glenn Branca spinoff than a college-rock favorite." A mixed review from Select found the album to be derivative of acts like Dinosaur Jr. & Swervedriver, despite noting its "beguiling rhythmic charm".

The Wire included the album on their year-end "Out Rock-Pop" list.

Legacy

Under the Radar called the album a "gift" that "explode[s] your mind with inventive guitar work." Dusted Magazine called it "fresh and off-the-cuff". The album is now described by many as being a "landmark" and a "classic". According to Popmatters, the album along with its follow up "found the best balance between [...] assaulting you with bending notes one moment, and soaring over you with crunching anthems the next." Peter Watts of Uncut reviewed the album's 2020 reissue very positively, and hailed the closing track "Gemini Cusp" as a "lo-fi prog masterpiece."

Treble included the album on their list, "Merge Records: 20 Essential Albums". Similarly, Popmatters included it on "Merge's Silver Age: 25 Essential Albums Over 25 Years".

Track listing
 "Thermal Treasure" – 4:32
 "Lazy Comet" – 3:49
 "My Kimono" – 2:21
 "Sure Shot" – 3:24
 "Stinger (Five Wigs)" – 7:23
 "Tilebreaker" – 4:09
 "Shiska" – 1:30
 "Time Isn't On My Side" – 3:06
 "Action Vs. Vibe" – 3:43
 "Gemini Cusp" – 7:05

Personnel
Ash Bowie – vocals, guitar
Dave Brylawski – guitar, backing vocals
Steve Popson – bass guitar
Eddie Watkins – drums

References

Polvo albums
1993 albums
Merge Records albums